Anuthatantrum is the second studio album by Da Brat. It was released in 1996 and went Gold in 1997. A single culled from the album was "Ghetto Love", which featured TLC member Tionne Watkins and peaked at number 20 on the Billboard Hot 100.

Critical reception 

AllMusic writer Steve Huey called it "a slight improvement" over her debut record Funkdafied, praising Dupri's beats for going into an "early-'80s urban funk direction" and Da Brat's lyricism being bereft of any "old-school quotes and obvious Snoop Dogg bites" and having more of a focused identity, concluding that, "[I]t's another brief album, but Anuthatantrum does show Da Brat making subtle progress, and Dupri's production is inviting once again." J. D. Considine, writing for Entertainment Weekly, gave credit to the "funky foundation of [Jermaine] Dupri's tuneful, efficient backing tracks" for making Da Brat's "bluster than menace" gangster boasts come across as more tolerable. Martin Johnson of the Chicago Tribune wrote that: "On her debut recording, her flow worked solely with basic George Clinton samples, but on the follow-up she rhymes in a variety of styles and her vocabulary has improved. Sadly, these skills are wasted on narrow and cliched subject matter, such as people who don't like her and people who don't respect her."

Track listing 

Notes
 signifies a co-producer
 "Sittin' on Top of the World" features additional vocals from Manuel Seal
 Just a Little Bit More" features background vocals from Trey Lorenz
 "Keepin' it Live" features background vocals from Manuel Seal

Sample credits
 "Anuthatantrum" contains a sample of "The Soul Cages" by Sting
 "Sittin' on Top of the World" contains a sample of "Mary Jane" by Rick James
 "Let's All Get High" contains a sample of "Be Alright" written by Roger Troutman, performed by Zapp
 "Just a Little Bit More" contains a sample of "Déjà Vu" written by Isaac Hayes and Adrienne Anderson, performed by Dionne Warwick
 "Ghetto Love" contains samples of "All This Love" by DeBarge and "Public Enemy No. 1" by Public Enemy
 "Lyrical Molestation" contains samples of "Roots" by Ian Carr and "Who Shot Ya?" by The Notorious B.I.G.
 "Live It Up" contains a sample of "Put It in Your Mouth" by Akinyele
 "Make It Happen" contains a sample of "Crab Apple Jam" by David Snell

AnuthaFunkdafiedTantrum 
Disc 1
 "Fa All Y'All"
 "Funkdafied"
 "Mind Blowin'"
 "Give it 2 You Remix"
 "Da B Side"

Disc 2
 "Sittin' on Top of the World"
 "Let's Get High"
 "Just a Lil' Bit More"
 "Ghetto Love" (feat. T-Boz)
 "Make it Happen"

Personnel
Credits adapted from the liner notes of Anuthatantrum.

 LaMarquis Jefferson – bass 
 Carl-So-Lowe – keyboards 
 Phil Tan – engineer, mixing
 John Frye – assistant engineer
 Brian Frye – assistant engineer
 Bernie Grundman – mastering
 Erwin Gorostiza – art direction and design
 Silvia Otte – photography
 Byron Gillison – Anuthatantrum logotype design

Charts

Certifications

References

1996 albums
Da Brat albums
So So Def Recordings albums
Albums produced by Jermaine Dupri